Umar Alisha (born 2 August 1966) is the ninth peetadhipathi of Sri Viswa Viznana Vidya Adhyatmika Peetham He became head of this 545-year-old institution on 9 September 1989, succeeding his father, Mohiddin Badusha II.

Alisha is the chairman of the Umar Alisha Rural Development Trust and the Umar Alisha Sahithi Samithi. Alisha is also a poet, writing in the Telugu language, and the editor-in-chief of spiritual magazine Tatvaznanamu.

He is a homeopath.

Awards & recognitions
 Andhra Pradesh Green Award 2017 by Andhra Pradesh Greening and Beautification Corporation , Government of Andhra Pradesh , 1st Prize for NGO Category.  
 2018 Biodiversity Conserver Award ,Government of Andhra Pradesh
 11-12-2017 - Dr Umar Alisha, received the prestigious “Mother Theresa Lifetime Achievement Award” for his services to the society from Mother India International.
 2-10-2017: Rotary Club Kakinada honoured Dr. Umar Alisha with “Rotary Vocational Excellence Award” at  Kakinada for outstanding service to the community.
21-5-2016 : Name of Dr Umar Alisha entered into Wonder Book of Records & International Genius Book of Records 
9-4-2016 : Vamsee international : National Integrity and Service Award
8-4-2016 : Name of Dr Umar Alisha entered into Telugu Book of Records 
3-1-2016 : Savitri Bai Phule Life Time Achievement Award by : savitri Bai Phule charitable trust, Visakhapatnam 
8-1-2016  : Atmiya Puraskaram to Dr Umar Alisha by Honble Chief Minister Sri N Chandra Babu Naidu During the Kakinada Beach Festival 
24-12-2015 : Visistha Seva puraskaram on the occasion of National Consumers Protection Day at Pithapuram
5-12-2015 : Visistha Seva puraskaram on the occasion of World NGOs Day at JNTU Kakinada “Visistha Ugadi Puraskaram ” , from Government of Andhra Pradesh. 
Felicitation to Dr Umar Alisha at 4th World Telugu Congress, Tirupathi
“Bharata Sarva Matha Santhi Dutha” National Award, from Mother India International. 
“Ugadi Praskaram 2012” from  Visakha Samacharam.  
“Vikrutinama Ugadi Praskaram 2010” from  Kinnera Art Theatres & 
Kinnera Cultural & Education Trust, Hyderabad.  
“Best Citizen Of India 2010” from International Publishing House, New Delhi.
Mr Sven Jurschewsky Counsellor, Political  Economic Affairs, Canadian High Commission meets Dr Umar Alisha at Hyderabad on 1-2-2010
“Chikitsak Ratan Award” from Global Society for Health & Educational Growth, New Delhi.
“Bharata Ratnasri - 2009” National Award, from Mother India International. 
“Certificate of Commendation” 2005 & 2007 by Collector and District Magistrate of East Godavari District on the eve of Republic Day Celebrations.
“Son of India 2007” Award, By Mother India International.
“ Visesha Puraskaram – 2006 ” Award, from  Dr Ramineni Foundation,    USA.

Selected writings
Cosmic Wisdom Part I 

Nivedika (Appraisal)

References

External links
Praying for global peace : The Hindu Dated : 12 Feb 2017
Ramineni Foundation Award - Vishishta Puraskaaram - 2006
Umar Alisha gets Vamsee Award
Official Website of Umar Alisha Rural Development Trust, Pithapuram
Official Website of Sri Viswa Viznana Vidya Adhyatmika Peetham, Pithapuram

Indian Hindu monks
Hindu philosophers and theologians
Indian spiritual writers
Indian Sufis
Indian Theosophists
20th-century Indian philosophers
21st-century Indian philosophers
People from East Godavari district
Telugu poets
Vedanta
20th-century Hindu religious leaders
21st-century Hindu religious leaders
1966 births
Living people